The European Under-23 Baseball Championship is held biennially between national baseball teams in Europe, governed by the Confederation of European Baseball (CEB).

Results

Medal table

References

Baseball
International baseball competitions in Europe
Biennial sporting events
Under-23 sports competitions
WBSC Europe competitions